A Bill of Divorcement may refer to:

 A Bill of Divorcement (play), a 1921 play by Clemence Dane, on which the following films are based:
 A Bill of Divorcement (1922 film)
 A Bill of Divorcement (1932 film)
 A Bill of Divorcement (1940 film)

See also
Divorce, the termination of a marriage or marital union
Divorce Bill (disambiguation)